Zu is the Mandarin pinyin romanization of the Chinese surname written  in Chinese character. It is romanized Tsu in Wade–Giles. It is listed 249th in the Song dynasty classic text Hundred Family Surnames. It is not among the 300 most common surnames in China.

Notable people
 Zu Ti (祖逖; 266–321), celebrated Eastern Jin general
 Zu Yue (祖約; died 330), Eastern Jin general, younger brother of Zu Ti
 Zu Chongzhi (429–500), Liu Song dynasty mathematician and astronomer
 Zu Gengzhi (450? – 520?), mathematician, son of Zu Chongzhi
 Zu Ting (6th century), scholar-official of the Northern Qi dynasty
 Zu Xiaosun (6th – 7th century), Sui and Tang dynasty musician
 Zu Yong (699–746?), Tang dynasty poet
 Zu Dashou (died 1656), Ming dynasty general who surrendered to the Qing
 Zu Zhiwang (祖之望; 1754–1813), Qing dynasty Governor of Hunan and Shandong provinces
 John B. Tsu (1924–2005),  Chinese academic and lobbyist for Asians in the United States
 Jidi or Zu Yale (born 1983), cartoonist and illustrator

References

Chinese-language surnames
Individual Chinese surnames